Live in Japan is a double album by Shirley Bassey, recorded July 8, 1974 at Kosei-Nenkin Kaikan Hall in Tokyo, Japan. The album was released in Japan only, and the reverse of the cover listed the songs in English and Japanese. Live at Carnegie Hall had been released just a year prior, with nine of the same songs from Live in Japan, and it is believed that this is at least partly the reason Live in Japan didn't gain a worldwide release. Japan was an important growing market for many artists in the 1970s and many recorded live albums exclusively for release in Japan.

In 1981 Liberty Records released this recording on a single album that had different cover art, cut three of the songs, "Going, Going Gone", "All That Love Went To Waste", and "You and I" and had a different running order.

The original double album has been reproduced in its entirety, with original running order, on a 2008 CD on the BGO label, and reproduces the text from a booklet that came with the LP, which included the lyrics in English and Japanese.

Track listing

Side One
"Goldfinger" (Leslie Bricusse, Anthony Newley, John Barry)
"Sing" (Joe Raposo)
"Let Me Sing and I'm Happy" (Irving Berlin)
 "Make The World a Little Younger" (Terry Howell, Karen O'Hara, Denny McReynolds)
"Going, Going, Gone" (John Barry, Alan Jay Lerner)
Side Two
"Without You" (Tom Evans, Pete Ham)
"Diamonds Are Forever" (John Barry, Don Black)
"When You Smile" (William Salter, Ralph MacDonald)
"All That Love Went to Waste" (George Barrie, Sammy Cahn)
Side Three
"Big Spender" (Dorothy Fields, Cy Coleman)
"Day by Day" (Stephen Schwartz, John-Michael Tebelack)
"Never, Never, Never" (Tony Renis, Alberto Testa, Norman Newell)
"Something" (George Harrison)
Tabs*
Side Four
"Yesterday, When I Was Young" (Charles Aznavour, Herbert Kretzmer)
Introduction of orchestra
"You and I" (Leslie Bricusse)
Tabs*
"This Is My Life" (Norman Newell, Bruno Canfora, Antonio Amum)
Tabs*

 * (Shirley Bassey acknowledging audience applause)

Personnel
 Shirley Bassey – vocal
 Arthur Greenslade - Musical director
 Nobuo Hara and His Sharps & Flats - orchestra
 Jack Cavari - Guitar
 Bobby Shankin - Drums

References 

Shirley Bassey albums
1974 live albums
Albums arranged by Arthur Greenslade
United Artists Records live albums